The Routine  is the debut studio album by the American alternative metal band Hotwire. Produced by Matt Hyde, it was released on June 3, 2003, through RCA Records. The single "Not Today", was a hit on American rock radio, peaking at No. 40 on the Billboard Mainstream Rock chart. It is the band's last release before Hotwire disbanded.

Track listing

Personnel

Hotwire
Rus Martin – Lead vocals, rhythm guitar 
Gabe Garcia – Lead guitar, backing vocals
Chris Strauser – Bass guitar
Brian Borg – Drums, percussion

Management
Stephen Hutton & Chris Allen –   Management for Uppercut Management, Mosaic Media Group
Doug LeDuc & Davud Weise –  Business Management for Gleiberman, Weise, & Associates
Brian Schall – Legal for Barnes, Morris, Klein, Mark, Yorn & Levine
Brian Malouf –  A&R
Sandi Schaffer – US Booking Agent for Evolution Talent
Steve Strange – International Booking Agent for Helter Skelter

Artwork
Frank Harkins – Art Direction
Singer Desgn Co. – Album Design
Marina Chavez – Photography

Production
Matt Hyde – Producer, mixing
Critter – Engineer
Dan Druff – Editing, guitar technician
Paul Forgues – Editing, engineer
Stephen Marcussen – Mastering
Pete Martine & Victor McCoyz –  Assistant engineers
Edmond Monsef –  Editing
John Nicholsen –  Drum Technician
Mike Terry –  Editing, engineer

Trivia
The song "Not Today" appeared in the Konami videogame Evolution Skateboarding.
The song "Invisible" appeared in the EA videogame Need for Speed: Underground.

References

2003 albums
Hotwire (band) albums
RCA Records albums
Albums recorded at Sound City Studios